Ronald Stanley, (born March 6, 1983) is a former American football player who played for three seasons with the Pittsburgh Steelers. He played college football for the Michigan State Spartans.

References

1983 births
Living people
American football linebackers
Michigan State Spartans football players
Pittsburgh Steelers players
Players of American football from Michigan
Sportspeople from Saginaw, Michigan